John Nava (born 1947) is an American painter and tapestry designer. His most famous work is "The Communion of Saints", a series of tapestry panels in the interior of the Roman Catholic Cathedral of Our Lady of the Angels in Los Angeles.

Career
Nava studied at the University of California, Santa Barbara, and went on to graduate study at the Villa Schifanoia Graduate School of Fine Art in Florence, Italy.

References

20th-century American painters
American male painters
21st-century American painters
21st-century American male artists
American textile designers
1947 births
Living people
20th-century American male artists